Miss USA 1955 was the 4th Miss USA pageant, held at Long Beach Municipal Auditorium, Long Beach, California on July 20, 1955. The pageant was won by Carlene King Johnson of Vermont, who was crowned by outgoing titleholder Miriam Stevenson of South Carolina.  King Johnson went on to finish as a Top 15 semi-finalist at Miss Universe 1955.  First runner-up Margaret Haywood later went to London for Miss World 1955, finishing first runner-up to Susana Duijm of Venezuela.

Placements

Delegates

Historical significance 
 Vermont wins competition for the first time. Also becoming in the 4th state who does it for the first time.
 Arkansas earns the 1st runner-up position for the first time, becoming its highest placement of the state until 1982.
 Nebraska earns the 2nd runner-up position for the first time, becoming its highest placement of the state until 2018.
 California earns the 3rd runner-up position for the first time, becoming its highest placement of the state until 1959.
 Georgia earns the 4th runner-up position for the first time.
 States that placed in semifinals the previous year were Arkansas, California, Illinois, Nebraska, New York, New York City, South Carolina, Texas and Wisconsin.
 New York placed for the fourth consecutive year.
 California, Illinois, Nebraska, South Carolina and Texas placed for the third consecutive year.
 Arkansas, New York City and Wisconsin made their second consecutive placement.
 Colorado, Florida and Washington last placed in 1953.
 Georgia, New Mexico and Vermont placed for the first time.
 Iowa and Ohio break an ongoing streak of placements since 1953.
 Minnesota breaks an ongoing streak of placements since 1952.

External links 
 

1955
1955 in the United States
1955 beauty pageants
1955 in California
1955